Barış Dilaver (born in Istanbul, Turkey in 1975) is a Turkish ballet dancer.

Early life
Dilaver was born in Zeytinburnu, Istanbul. As a child, he aspired to be a pianist, while his twin sister aimed to become a ballerina. However, they switched professions after both failing their respective auditions. Dilaver's sister later became a successful singer in their home country, while he pursued a career as a ballet dancer internationally.

At the age of 10, Barış Dilaver began his dance education and training at the National Ballet School of Istanbul under the direction of Cem Ertekin. During his studies, he performed in Graduation Ball, and he eventually became a member of the Cagdas Ballet Company.

At the age of 14, Dilaver dreamed of dancing for prestigious ballet companies in Vienna and New York. While in Istanbul, he met dancer Nilay Yesiltepe, who helped him realize his dreams. Thanks to Yesiltepe's support, Dilaver landed an audition in Germany and secured the necessary funding from sponsors Ardic Gursel and Nuray Atabay.

In Stuttgart, Dilaver studied at the John Cranko School under the guidance of Alex Ursuliak and Konstantin Rusau. In 1994, he moved to Vienna at the invitation of Anne Wooliams, the director of the State Opera Ballet. Dilaver danced in several of ballet's iconic roles, such as Puck in John Nermeier's A Midsummer Night's Dream, a part created specifically for him, and Mercutio in John Cranko's Romeo and Juliet. His repertoire also includes choreographies by renowned choreographers such as Kenneth MacMillan, Renato Zanella, and William Forsythe. Dilaver received coaching from prominent ballet master Egon Madsen and shared the stage with ballet legends Vladimir Malakhov and Brigitte Stadler. He also danced at the Vienna Dance Theater before becoming a Solo Dancer at the Volksoper Vienna, where he performed roles such as Cupido in Caravaggio and danced in Swan Lake Remixed and Nudo.

Career

From 1993 to 2001, the prolific dancer performed in Germany, France, Ukraine, Hungary, Austria, Switzerland, Greece and his native Turkey. After this extensive touring, Baris decided to move from classical ballet to contemporary dance in order to widen his artistic horizons. In 2002, he choreographed a presentation for the Swarovski Crystal World, which took him to Germany and Austria. Soon after, he bought a video camera, started filming dancers, and became fascinated with multimedia as a means of expressing through his eye. He was soon to add another string to his artistic bow, when he started making films and documentaries for dance companies and opera houses and pursued two parallel careers – dance and filmmaking. He also founded his own film production company called db Dance Film.

In 2003, Baris created his first choreography at the Odeon Space in Vienna, which included other works by European choreographers and in which he performed in a short duet. He captured this event on film and produced Out There, A Play Through Time, which was later featured at the Vienna Short Film Festival. He went on to create over a dozen dance films and documentaries on dancers and dance venues, including the very first Black Dance Festival in Vienna, featuring performances by New York’s Opus Theater and the Dallas Ballet. He also filmed the International Impulse Dance Festival in Vienna, directed, choreographed and performed by Ismael Ivo (Mapplethorpe).

A few years earlier, Baris had seen Cirque du Soleil’s production Alegría in Vienna and immediately saw himself in one of the company’s shows. After contacting Cirque’s casting department in 2003, he was invited to Berlin a month later to audition for one of three coveted dance roles, and made the cut. He joined Cirque’s Dralion tour a year later.

In 2005, Baris danced in New Opera Vienna's production Seven Deadly Sins, which he captured on film, and later joined Cirque du Soleil’s innovative multimedia touring show Delirium, under the direction of American choreographer Mia Michaels. The show visited more than 150 cities across the United States, Canada, Mexico and Europe.

Baris Dilaver currently lives in Vienna, where he is pursuing his work as a choreographer and filmmaker.

Metamorphosis of Turk

Metamorphosis of Turk is a film produced and directed by Barış Dilaver with script edited by Martina Flor, Evelyn Wysoudil, Barış Dilaver and camera assistance by Murat Noyan, Helmut Fisher, Felix Schobert, Willy Wysoudil and Turkish translation by Elif Aksoy.

Synopsis
Born in Istanbul in 1975, he left his home country at a very young age after having completed his training to become a ballet dancer. He spent the following 20 years dancing on stages all over the world, including the Vienna State Opera. In 2007 a serious injury put a sudden end to his career as a professional dancer – a turning point in his life. 
Convalescent and deprived of his identity as a dancer, he decided to come back to Vienna, where he had found a second home. But his return proved to be disillusioning: The Viennese, who are known for their heart of gold and who welcomed him with open arms when he was still a member of the State Opera’s ballet, were now fearful, disrespectful and, in some cases, even hostile in their reactions to the Turks in Vienna.
And that's when he embarked on his journey in search of his identity and his future and he started by searching for his roots. He shared the fate of his Turkish home country: He had started to feel and act "European" a long time ago but did that mean that he had to deny his Turkish identity? And did he want to be part of a Europe whose right-wing populists tried hard to preserve an image of Turkey characterized by Islamism, women being forced to wear headscarves and forced marriage? His search for what unites us and what separates us made him delve deeper into the history of Europe and Turkey, the Ottoman Empire, the Christian and Islamic religions. 
Movement, change, being on the road and an open future: these notions characterize his own life and are also reflected in his film. It is an attempt to fight static views and black-and-white judgments which lead to generalizations and tell only half the truth, thus frustrating any chance of fruitful dialogue. But on the other hand there is also an abundance of positive encounters and experience that marked the joint history of two countries and these are also shown in his film. 
247,000 Turks live in Austria, many of them in Vienna. Being one of them, it is probably his purpose in life to build a bridge between two cultures, which are full of similarities and diversity, like the bridge across the Bosporus which connects the Orient and the Occident.

Dance education
1992–1994: John Cranko Schule, Stuttgart, Germany
 1984–1989: Staatliche Ballettschule, Istanbul

Engagements
 2005: Cirque du Soleil
 2005: Neue Oper Wien
 2004: Cirque Du Soleil
 2004: Volksoper, Vienna
 2002: Landestheatre, Linz
 1999–2002: Volksoper, Vienna
 1994–1997: Staatsoper, Vienna
 1985–1989: Cagdas Ballett, Istanbul

Coaching/ Workshop:
  Vienna Volks Oper
 Tanz TheaterWien
 Move On Dance Center
 John Harris
 MQ Wien
 Video dance workshop
 Delirium Tour / Cirque du Soleil

Filmography and documentaries
 Black Dance Festival
 Neue Oper Wien
 7 Deadly Sins
 Ismael Ivo, Impulstanz (Mapplethorpe)
 Dallas Ballet
 Opus Theater New York
 Tanz Theater-Vienna (Fake Space)
 Joe Alegado (Smoke)
 Russell Adams
 NUD'EAU
 Air Pas de deux
 Donald Duck’s Sins
 Mask
 Out there a play through time ... 
 Video dance workshop with Baris Dilaver
 Cirque du Soleil / Delirium - Through the eye of the Artist 1207

Guest performance

 2005 Cirque du Soleil
 2004 Cirque du Soleil
 2003 Odeon Theater
 2002 Akropolis, Athen2002
 2002 Landestheater, Linz
 2001 Tanzsommer, Innsbruck
 2001 Musical Theatre Basel
 2001 Baden Baden
 2001 Prinzregententheater, Munich
 1998 Tanztheater Wien, Vienna
 1998 Dance Festival Week Impuls, Vienna
 1996 Budapest Opera House
 1996 State Opera Kiew
 1994 Conservatoire National Superieur de Musique, Lyon
 1993 Rencontres International de la Dance, La Baule,
 1993 International Dance Project, Bonn

Repertoire
Choreography / Choreographer / role
 Midsummernights Dream / John Neumeier /  as Puck
 Romeo and Juliet / John Cranko /  as Mercutio
 Das Lied von der Erde / Kenneth MacMillan / as Junge
 Caravaggio / Liz King, Mani Obeya & Esther Balfe /  as Cupido
 Swanlake / Rudolf Nurejew
 Sleeping Beauty/Petipa
 Nutcracker / Petipa /  as Spanish Dance
 Merry Widow / Ronald Hynd / as Chrorus
 Manon/Kenneth MacMillan / as Bettlerkönig
 Giselle/Petipa /  Bauer, Pas de deux
 Love songs / William Forsythe
 Apollo / Renato Zanella
 Sacre du Printemps / Renato Zanella
 Tryptichon / Renato Zanella
 Mata Hari / Renato Zanella
 Empty Place / Renato Zanella
 Those I have forgot / Marco Santi
 The doors / Marco Santi
 Nudo / Giorgo Madia
 7 Deadly Sins / Neue Oper Wien
 Dralion / Cirque du Soleil
 Delirium / Cirque du Soleil

References

Sources
 http://www.radikal.com.tr/Radikal.aspx?aType=HaberYazdir&ArticleID=964323
 http://www.ernstschmiederer.com/2009/08/post.php
 https://web.archive.org/web/20180921034441/https://www.sheffieldtelegraph.co.uk/news/a_moving_circus_performance_from_baris_1_439359
 http://www.neueoperwien.at/index.php?where=now&lng=de&id=5&y=2005&work_id=052&sub=brief

External links
Official website
Metamorphosis of Turk - Film by Barış Dilaver

Turkish male ballet dancers
Turkish choreographers
1975 births
Living people
People from Istanbul